Żywkowo  is a village in the administrative district of Gmina Górowo Iławeckie, within Bartoszyce County, Warmian-Masurian Voivodeship, in northern Poland, close to the border with the Kaliningrad Oblast of Russia.

It is one of the most popular Polish so called "Storks villages". For 30 inhabitants accrue about 160 storks and 42 nests.

History
After World War II the place of German displaced residents, replaced by Ukrainian displaced from the operation "Vistula" and today their descendants inhabit the village.

References

Villages in Bartoszyce County